Inveraray in Argyllshire was a royal burgh that returned one commissioner to the Parliament of Scotland and to the Convention of Estates.

After the Acts of Union 1707, Inveraray, Ayr, Campbeltown, Irvine and Rothesay formed the Ayr district of burghs, returning one member between them to the House of Commons of Great Britain.

List of burgh commissioners

 1661–63: John Yuill, provost 
 1669–74: Sir Colin Campbell of Aberuchill
 1678 (convention), 1681–82: William Broun, provost 
 1685–86: John McNaughton, councillor 
 1689 (convention), 1689–1702: Hugh Broune 
 1702–07: Daniel (or Donald) Campbell of Ardintenie

See also
 List of constituencies in the Parliament of Scotland at the time of the Union

References

Constituencies of the Parliament of Scotland (to 1707)
Constituencies disestablished in 1707
1707 disestablishments in Scotland
Politics of Argyll and Bute
History of Argyll and Bute
Inveraray